A New Leaf or New Leaf may refer to:

 "A New Leaf" (short story), by F. Scott Fitzgerald
 A New Leaf (film), a 1971 film
 A New Leaf (TV series), a 2014 South Korean television series
 "New Leaf" (SpongeBob SquarePants), a 2006 episode of SpongeBob SquarePants
 New Leaf (Scheer), a 2007 public artwork by Lisa Scheer
 Animal Crossing: New Leaf, a 2012 video game
 NewLeaf, a former Canadian virtual airline
 New Leaf Market, California-based health food stores bought by New Seasons Market
 A New Leaf (book),  a 2004 non-fiction book about cannabis by Alyson Martin and Nushin Rashidian